Godgory was a Swedish melodic death metal/death doom metal band that was formed in 1992 by drummer Erik Andersson and vocalist Matte Andersson (unrelated).

Formation and Invasion Records era 
Forming in 1992, Godgory started their career covering bands such as Napalm Death, Entombed, Cemetary, Unleashed, and Grave. It was not until April 1994 that they entered Unisound Studio and recorded their debut demo entitled Demo-94, consisting of original material.

The band sent out the demo to labels and zines around the world and received a positive response. One label wanted to sign Godgory for a full-length CD, so the band returned to Unisound in November 1994 and, in one weekend, recorded their debut album Sea of Dreams. After recording was complete, the deal with the label fell through; the band was left with a recorded album and no label to release it.

The band sent the completed tape to labels in search of a new record deal. Eventually, the German label Invasion Records was found to release Sea of Dreams; they were impressed enough by the recording to sign the band to release a second CD as well. Sea of Dreams finally saw release in January 1996, over a year after the recording session.

The debut album received very good reviews in magazines around the world and sold around 5,000 copies. Emboldened by this success, Godgory returned to Unisound in October 1996 to record the follow-up album Shadow's Dance. The band had added Thomas Heder on keyboards, and, in contrast to the "live" recording style used on Sea of Dreams, spent three weeks recording each instrument separately.

Upon release, Shadow's Dance received very good reviews and ended up on the 7th place on the Rockhards Dynamite list. In the end, Shadow's Dance sold around 10,000 copies.

New line-up and Nuclear Blast era 
After Godgory had recorded Shadow's Dance, Erik and Matte decided to let go of three members: Mikael Dahlqvist (guitars), Fredric Danielsson (bass), and Thomas Heder (keyboards). The three members were involved with the progressive metal band World of Silence and had given priority to that band, while Erik and Matte wanted members who could devote all of their energy to Godgory. Around this time, rhythm guitarist Stefan Grundel (formerly Olsson) left Godgory to concentrate on his education.

With just two remaining members, the band was in search of another record deal. Godgory had heard that Nuclear Blast were interested in them, so they inquired with the label; this resulted in a new, two-album deal. In May 1998 Godgory recorded one new song, "Conspiracy of Silence", for the Nuclear Blast sampler Beauty in Darkness Vol. 3. This song was the first Godgory material recorded outside Unisound; it was recorded at Studio Fasaden in Hagfors, Sweden.

In October 1998, the band returned to Studio Fasaden to record their third full-length, Resurrection. Since Godgory was not a complete band at this point (despite an interest in locating additional full-time members), they recruited former members Mikael Dahlqvist and Thomas Heder to temporarily rejoin the band as session members. Godgory also invited Fredrik Olsson to participate as an additional vocalist, as he has written many lyrics for the band; Fredrik handled whispered vocals on the album, while Matte recorded all harsh vocals. Recording took place over a period of five weeks. Resurrection was released in May 1999 to positive reception, and the album placed at number 8 on the Rockhard Dynamite list.

Two years after the release of Resurrection, Godgory entered Studio Fredman to record their fourth album, Way Beyond, with renowned producer Fredrik Nordström. Mikael Dahlqvist, Thomas Heder, and Fredrik Olsson again joined the band on a session basis, along with World of Silence member Henrik Lindström on guitars and bass. Also for this album, Erik switched from drums to keyboards, and the album was recorded with programmed drums. Way Beyond was released in October 2001.

The band split up in 2004.

Discography

Demo albums 
1994 – Demo '94

Studio albums

References 

Swedish death metal musical groups
Musical groups established in 1992
Musical groups disestablished in 2004
Nuclear Blast artists